The Nieman Foundation for Journalism at Harvard University is the primary journalism institution at Harvard. It was founded in February 1938 as the result of a $1.4 million bequest by Agnes Wahl Nieman, the widow of Lucius W. Nieman, founder of The Milwaukee Journal. Scholarships were established for journalists with at least three years' experience to go back to college to advance their work. She stated the goal was "to promote and elevate the standards of journalism in the United States and educate persons deemed specially qualified for journalism." It is based at Walter Lippmann House in Cambridge, Massachusetts.

Programs

The Nieman Foundation is best known as home to the Nieman Fellows, a group of journalists from around the world who come to Harvard for a year of study. Many noted journalists, and from 1959, also photojournalists, have been Nieman Fellows, including John Carroll, Dexter Filkins, Susan Orlean, Robert Caro, Hodding Carter, Michael Kirk, Alex Jones, Anthony Lewis, Robert Maynard, Allister Sparks, Stanley Forman, Hedrick Smith, Lucia Annunziata, Jonathan Yardley, Philip Meyer, Howard Sochurek and Huy Duc. It is considered the most prestigious fellowship program for journalists; Nieman Fellows have collectively won 101 Pulitzer Prizes.

The foundation is also the home of Nieman Reports, a quarterly journal on journalism issues. The journal has been in publication for more than 60 years. For several years, ending in 2009, the foundation sponsored the annual Nieman Conference on Narrative Journalism, the largest conference of its kind, which attracted hundreds of writers, filmmakers, and broadcasters to Boston. The narrative program now consists of a writing seminar for Fellows, and a public website, Nieman Storyboard, which covers storytelling across media. In 2004, the Foundation launched Nieman Watchdog,  a website intended to encourage more aggressive questioning of the powerful by news organizations. In 2008, the foundation created the Nieman Journalism Lab, an effort to investigate future models that could support quality journalism.

Awards

Several prestigious literary or journalism awards are based at the Nieman Foundation. They include three given in connection with the Columbia University School of Journalism:
 The J. Anthony Lukas Book Prize ($10,000, "recognizes superb examples of nonfiction writing that exemplify literary grace, a commitment to serious research and social concern")
 The Mark Lynton History Prize ($10,000, awarded to the "book-length work of history, on any subject, that best combines intellectual or scholarly distinction with felicity of expression")
 The J. Anthony Lukas Work-in-Progress Award ($30,000, "given annually to aid in the completion of a significant work of nonfiction")

Other awards based at Nieman include:
 The Worth Bingham Prize for Investigative Reporting ($20,000, "honors investigative reporting of stories of national significance where the public interest is being ill-served")
 The I.F. Stone Medal for Journalistic Independence ("to a journalist whose work captures the spirit of independence, integrity, courage, and indefatigability that characterized I. F. Stone's Weekly")
 The Louis Lyons Award for Conscience and Integrity in Journalism ("recognizes displays of conscience and integrity by individuals, groups or institutions in communications")
 The Taylor Family Award for Fairness in Newspapers ($10,000, "recognizes fairness in newspaper reporting")

Curators

The leader of the Nieman Foundation is known as its "curator" — a holdover from a brief moment after Agnes Wahl Nieman's death when her gift was to be used to build a microfilm library of quality journalism. The foundation has appointed eight curators:
 Archibald MacLeish, 1938–1939
 Louis M. Lyons (Nieman Fellow class of 1939), 1939–1964
 Dwight E. Sargent (Nieman Fellow class of 1951), 1964–1972
 James C. Thomson Jr., 1972–1984
 Howard Simons (Nieman Fellow class of 1959), 1984–1989
 Bill Kovach (Nieman Fellow class of 1989), 1989–2000
 Robert H. Giles (Nieman Fellow class of 1966), 2000 – June 2011
 Ann Marie Lipinski (Nieman Fellow class of 1990), 2011 –

References

External links
 Nieman Foundation
 Nieman Journalism Lab
 Nieman Reports
 Nieman Watchdog

Harvard University research institutes
1938 establishments in Massachusetts
Educational foundations in the United States
American journalism organizations
Organizations established in 1938